Khonkhino is a rural locality (an ulus) in Kurumkansky District, Republic of Buryatia, Russia. The population was 135 as of 2010. There is 1 street.

Geography 
Khonkhino is located 14 km southwest of Kurumkan (the district's administrative centre) by road. Galgatay is the nearest rural locality.

References 

Rural localities in Kurumkansky District